RPK-9 Medvedka ("Mole cricket", NATO Designation SS-N-29)  is a modern missile system used to engage submarines. The system consists of a launcher with eight missiles, each with the small torpedo as the warhead. Currently this system is installed on Steregushchiy-class corvettes and will be utilised by the Admiral Gorshkov-class frigate in the future.

Specifications
Operational depth: 
Total weight of system (with 8 missiles): 
Total weight of system (with 4 missiles): 
Missile weight: 
Diameter:

Operators

Russian Navy

References

External links
 Warfare.ru article

RPK-009
Anti-submarine missiles
RPK-009
Moscow Institute of Thermal Technology products